39S ribosomal protein L30, mitochondrial is a protein that in humans is encoded by the MRPL30 gene.

Function 

Mammalian mitochondrial ribosomal proteins are encoded by nuclear genes and help in protein synthesis within the mitochondrion. Mitochondrial ribosomes (mitoribosomes) consist of a small 28S subunit and a large 39S subunit. They have an estimated 75% protein to rRNA composition compared to prokaryotic ribosomes, where this ratio is reversed. Another difference between mammalian mitoribosomes and prokaryotic ribosomes is that the latter contain a 5S rRNA. Among different species, the proteins comprising the mitoribosome differ greatly in sequence, and sometimes in biochemical properties, which prevents easy recognition by sequence homology. This gene encodes a 39S subunit protein. Sequence analysis identified at least two transcript variants encoding the same protein. Pseudogenes corresponding to this gene are found on chromosomes 6p and 12p.

References

Further reading

External links 
 

Ribosomal proteins